In mathematics, a ringed space is a family of (commutative) rings parametrized by open subsets of a topological space together with ring homomorphisms that play roles of restrictions. Precisely, it is a topological space equipped with a sheaf of rings called a structure sheaf. It is an abstraction of the concept of the rings of continuous (scalar-valued) functions on open subsets.

Among ringed spaces, especially important and prominent is a locally ringed space: a ringed space in which the analogy between the stalk at a point and the ring of germs of functions at a point is valid.

Ringed spaces appear in analysis as well as complex algebraic geometry and the scheme theory of algebraic geometry.

Note: In the definition of a ringed space, most expositions tend to restrict the rings to be commutative rings, including Hartshorne and Wikipedia. "Éléments de géométrie algébrique", on the other hand, does not impose the commutativity assumption, although the book mostly considers the commutative case.

Definitions

Note that it is not required that  be a local ring for every open set ; in fact, this is almost never the case.

Examples

If  is a manifold with some extra structure, we can also take the sheaf of differentiable, or complex-analytic functions. Both of these give rise to locally ringed spaces.

If  is an algebraic variety carrying the Zariski topology, we can define a locally ringed space by taking  to be the ring of rational mappings defined on the Zariski-open set  that do not blow up (become infinite) within . The important generalization of this example is that of the spectrum of any commutative ring; these spectra are also locally ringed spaces. Schemes are locally ringed spaces obtained by "gluing together" spectra of commutative rings.

Morphisms

 a continuous map 

There is an additional requirement for morphisms between locally ringed spaces:

Two morphisms can be composed to form a new morphism, and we obtain the category of ringed spaces and the category of locally ringed spaces. Isomorphisms in these categories are defined as usual.

Tangent spaces

Locally ringed spaces have just enough structure to allow the meaningful definition of tangent spaces. Let  be locally ringed space with structure sheaf ; we want to define the tangent space  at the point . Take the local ring (stalk)  at the point , with maximal ideal . The tangent space  is defined as the dual of this vector space.

So we only need to consider .

-modules

Given a locally ringed space , certain sheaves of modules on  occur in the applications, the -modules.

A morphism between two such -modules is a morphism of sheaves which is compatible with the given module structures. The category of -modules over a fixed locally ringed space  is an abelian category.

A sheaf of -modules is called quasi-coherent if it is, locally, isomorphic to the cokernel of a map between free -modules.

Citations

References
Section 0.4 of

External links 

Sheaf theory
Scheme theory